Edmund Peter Giambastiani Jr. (born May 4, 1948) is a retired United States Navy admiral who served as the seventh vice chairman of the Joint Chiefs of Staff from 2005 to 2007. He retired in 2007, after 37 years of service.

Early life and education
Giambastiani was born on May 4, 1948 in Canastota, New York. He graduated from the United States Naval Academy with leadership distinction in 1970.

Naval career

Giambastiani's operational assignments included several in which he was responsible for both demanding at-sea operations and the development of new technologies and experimental processes. Early sea assignments included  and the s blue crew. While assigned to USS Puffer, he was a 1973 winner of the Fleet Commander's Junior Officer Submarine Shiphandling Competition.

Giambastiani also led Submarine Development Squadron Twelve, an operational submarine squadron that also serves as the Navy's Warfare Center of Excellence for submarine doctrine and tactics. Established in 1949, Submarine Development Squadron Twelve is the oldest experimental unit of its kind in the U.S. military. He served as the first director of strategy and concepts at the Naval Doctrine Command, as well as Commander, Atlantic Fleet Submarine Force; Commander, Submarines Allied Command Atlantic; and Commander, Anti-Submarine and Reconnaissance Forces Atlantic in Norfolk, Virginia.

Giambastiani's other shore and staff assignments include duties as an enlisted program manager at the Navy Recruiting Command Headquarters, Washington, D.C., in the early days of the all volunteer force; Special Assistant to the Deputy Director for Intelligence, Central Intelligence Agency; and, a fellowship with the Chief of Naval Operations' Strategic Studies Group. As a flag officer, he served as the Deputy Chief of Staff for Resources, Warfare Requirements and Assessments for the Commander, United States Pacific Fleet; Director of Submarine Warfare for the Chief of Naval Operations; Deputy Chief of Naval Operations for Resources, Requirements, and Assessments; and as the Senior Military Assistant to Secretary of Defense Donald H. Rumsfeld. His previous assignment was as NATO's first Supreme Allied Commander Transformation (SACT) and as Combatant Commander of United States Joint Forces Command, where he led the transformation of NATO and U.S. military forces, capabilities and doctrines and the introduction of new technologies, from October 2, 2002 to August 1, 2005.

In 2003, in his capacity as Commander, United States Joint Forces Command, Giambastiani published a "lessons learned" report. While generally praising U.S. performance it highlighted numerous incidents of friendly fire.

Vice Chairman of the Joint Chiefs of Staff

On August 12, 2005, Giambastiani was sworn in as the seventh Vice Chairman of the Joint Chiefs of Staff, becoming the third naval officer to hold that position.

As Vice Chairman, Giambastiani chaired the Joint Requirements Oversight Council, co-chaired the Defense Acquisition Board, and served as a member of the National Security Council Deputies Committee, the Nuclear Weapons Council and the Missile Defense Executive Board. In addition, he worked with the Deputy Secretary of Defense Gordon R. England as Co-Chair of the Deputies Advisory Working Group, which oversees implementation of the 2006 Quadrennial Defense Review and other high level Departmental business issues.

On May 4–6, 2007, Giambastiani visited Tunisia, meeting with high-ranking military and civilian officials, including his Tunisian counterparts and Tunisian Foreign Minister Abdelwaheb Abdallah and Defense Minister Kamel Morjane. He went to the North Africa American Cemetery and Memorial on the outskirts of Tunis to pay his respects to fallen U.S. soldiers who had died there during the Tunisia campaign of World War II.

On June 1, 2007, Giambastiani announced his retirement from the military to spend more time with his family and pursue other ventures.  He retired on July 27, 2007.

Post-military career
Giambastiani's personal interests include amateur radio, for which he uses the call sign N4OC. He also currently serves as a guiding coalition member of the Project on National Security Reform. He also serves on the Advisory Board of Massachusetts Institute of Technology's Lincoln Laboratory and the Board of Trustees of the Mitre Corporation.

On October 8, 2009, airplane maker Boeing Co. announced that Giambastiani had been elected to its board of directors, effective immediately. The Seattle Times reported that "In a statement, Boeing chairman and chief executive Jim McNerney indicated that the addition of Giambastiani, who was the second-highest ranking officer in the U.S. military, is intended [...] to boost Boeing's influence with the Pentagon."

Dates of rank

Awards and decorations

Medals and ribbons

 Submarine Warfare insignia (Officer)
 Deep Submergence insignia (Officer)
 Office of the Joint Chiefs of Staff Identification Badge
 Office of the Secretary of Defense Identification Badge

His decorations include numerous personal and unit decorations, medals and ribbons including:

References

External links

|-

|-

1948 births
Atlantic Council 
Living people
People from Canastota, New York
United States Naval Academy alumni
United States submarine commanders
Recipients of the Defense Distinguished Service Medal
Recipients of the Legion of Merit
Recipients of the Meritorious Service Decoration
Recipients of the Military Order of the Cross of the Eagle, Class I
Recipients of the NATO Meritorious Service Medal
Recipients of the Navy Distinguished Service Medal
United States Navy admirals
Joint Chiefs of Staff
Vice Chairmen of the Joint Chiefs of Staff